The 2008 NCAA Division I women's soccer tournament (also known as the 2008 Women's College Cup) was the 27th annual single-elimination tournament to determine the national champion of NCAA Division I women's collegiate soccer. The semifinals and championship game were played at WakeMed Soccer Park in Cary, North Carolina from December 5–7, 2008 while the preceding rounds were played at various sites across the country from November 14–29.

North Carolina defeated Notre Dame in the final, 2–1, to win their nineteenth national title. This was a rematch of the 1994, 1996, 1999, and 2006 tournament finals, all won by the Tar Heels. The Tar Heels (25–1–2) were coached by Anson Dorrance.

The most outstanding offensive player was Casey Nogueira from North Carolina, and the most outstanding defensive player was Carrie Drew from Notre Dame. Nogueira and Drew, alongside nine other players, were named to the All-Tournament team.

The tournament's leading scorers were KayAnne Gummersall from Duke (4 goals, 1 assist), Kerri Hanks from Notre Dame (4 goals, 1 assist), Casey Nogueira from North Carolina (2 goals, 5 assists), and McCall Zerboni from UCLA (4 goals, 1 assist).

Qualification

All Division I women's soccer programs were eligible to qualify for the tournament. The tournament field remained fixed at 64 teams.

Format
Just as before, the final two rounds, deemed the Women's College Cup, were played at a pre-determined neutral site. All other rounds were played on campus sites at the home field of the higher-seeded team. The only exceptions were the first two rounds, which were played at regional campus sites. The top sixteen teams hosted four team-regionals on their home fields (with some exceptions, noted below) during the tournament's first weekend.

National seeds

Teams

Bracket

Notre Dame Bracket

Stanford Bracket

UCLA Bracket

North Carolina Bracket

College Cup

All-tournament team
Casey Nogueira, North Carolina (most outstanding offensive player)
Carrie Drew, Notre Dame (most outstanding defensive player)
Lauren Cheney, UCLA
Yael Averbuch, North Carolina
Brittani Bartok, North Carolina
Whitney Engen, North Carolina
Tobin Heath, North Carolina
Courtney Barg, Notre Dame
Kerri Hanks, Notre Dame
Kelsey Lysander, Notre Dame
Christen Press, Stanford

See also 
 NCAA Women's Soccer Championships (Division II, Division III)
 NCAA Men's Soccer Championships (Division I, Division II, Division III)

References

NCAA
NCAA Women's Soccer Championship
NCAA Division I Women's Soccer Tournament
NCAA Division I Women's Soccer Tournament
NCAA Division I Women's Soccer Tournament